Arie Andries "Andre" van der Louw (9 August 1933 – 20 October 2005) was a Dutch politician of the Labour Party (PvdA) and journalist.

Van der Louw worked as a civil servant for municipality of The Hague from November 1953 until October 1957. Van der Louw worked as a journalist for the VARA from October 1957 until January 1971 as a political editor from October 1957 until September 1965 and as a managing editor from September 1965 until January 1971 and also as editor-in-chief of teen magazine Hitweek from September 1965 until April 1969. Van der Louw also was active as a political activist and was one of the leaders of the New Left movement in the Netherlands which aimed to steer the Labour Party more to the Left. Van der Louw became a Member of the House of Representatives after the resignation of Ed Berg, serving from 12 January 1971 until his resignation on 1 May 1971. Van der Louw served as Chairman of the Labour Party from 1 May 1971 until 16 November 1974. In October 1974 Van der Louw was nominated as Mayor of Rotterdam, taking office on 16 November 1974. Van der Louw was appointed as Minister of Culture, Recreation and Social Work in the Cabinet Van Agt II, taking office on 11 September 1981. The Cabinet Van Agt II fell just seven months into its term on 12 May 1982 and continued to serve in a demissionary capacity until it was replaced by the caretaker Cabinet Van Agt III on 29 May 1982.

Van der Louw remained in active politics, in March 1983 he was nominated as Chairman of the Rijnmond Council, a direct electable sub national administrative layer between the municipalities and the provinces in the Rijnmond Area, serving from 16 April 1983 until 1 February 1986. Van der Louw also became active in the public sector and occupied numerous seats as a nonprofit director on several boards of directors and supervisory boards (Royal Dutch Football Association, Dutch Broadcast Foundation, International Architecture Biennal Rotterdam, Stichting Pensioenfonds Zorg en Welzijn, Royal Library of the Netherlands and the International Institute of Social History) and served on several state commissions and councils on behalf of the government (Advisory Council for Spatial Planning, Probation Agency, Stichting Pensioenfonds ABP, Cadastre Agency and the Council for Public Administration).

References

External links

Official
  A.A. (André) van der Louw Parlement.com

 

 

 

 
 

1933 births
2005 deaths
Chairmen of the Labour Party (Netherlands)
Deaths from cancer in the Netherlands
Deaths from lung cancer
Dutch atheists
Dutch autobiographers
Dutch humanists
Dutch magazine editors
Dutch male short story writers
Dutch short story writers
Dutch memoirists
Dutch newspaper editors
Dutch nonprofit directors
Dutch nonprofit executives
Dutch public broadcasting administrators
Dutch republicans
Dutch sports executives and administrators
Journalists from The Hague
Labour Party (Netherlands) politicians
Mayors of Rotterdam
Members of the House of Representatives (Netherlands)
Ministers of Social Work of the Netherlands
Ministers of Sport of the Netherlands
Politicians from The Hague
Writers about activism and social change
20th-century Dutch civil servants
20th-century Dutch journalists
20th-century Dutch male writers
20th-century Dutch politicians
20th-century memoirists